Rudolph Hering (February 26, 1847 – May 30, 1923) was a founder of modern environmental technology.

Biography

Rudolph Hering was born in Philadelphia on February 26, 1847. He came to Dresden at age 13 to attend school there and studied civil engineering at the Technische Universität Dresden as a member of the German Student Corps Altsachsen.
He was involved in the reversing of the Chicago river; his name features prominently in stories about the river reversal project. There is a medal named after him.

He died at his home in New York City on May 30, 1923. He is buried at West Laurel Hill Cemetery, Bala Cynwyd, Pennsylvania.

Notes

External links
 Rudolph Hering Society of Chicago
 Biography-West Laurel Hill Cemetery web site

1847 births
1923 deaths
American environmentalists
TU Dresden alumni
People from Chicago